The UAAP Season 84 volleyball tournaments was the volleyball event of the University Athletic Association of the Philippines for its 2021–22 school year. This was the first completed tournament since 2019. The men's, boys' and girls' volleyball tournaments were not held due to the pandemic. The games were held at the Mall of Asia Arena.

Tournament format 
The usual UAAP tournament format for tournaments having all eight teams will be followed:

 Double round eliminations; top four teams advance to the playoffs
 If there is a tie for second or fourth, a one-game playoff will be held
 If a team wins all elimination round games:
 #1 seed advance to the finals outright
 #2 seed advance to the second round of the stepladder semifinals with the twice-to-beat advantage; winner advances to the finals
 #3 and #4 seeds advance to the first round of the stepladder semifinals in a one-game playoff; winner advances to the second round
 If no team wins all elimination round games:
 #1 with the twice-to-beat advantage vs #4 seed in the semifinals
 #2 with the twice-to-beat advantage vs #3 seed in the semifinals
 The finals is a best-of-three series.

Teams
All eight member universities of the UAAP fielded teams in the women's division.

Team line-ups

Elimination round

Team standings

Match-up results

Game results 
Results on top and to the right of the gray cells are for first-round games; those to the bottom and to the left of it are for second-round games.

Fourth seed playoff 
Adamson and Ateneo, which are tied at fourth place, will play for the #4 seed, the last berth of the stepladder playoffs.

Bracket

Stepladder semifinals

First round 
This is a one-game playoff.

Second round 
La Salle has the twice-to-beat advantage.

Finals 
NU will a have best-of-three finals series against the semifinals winner.

Finals Most Valuable Player:

Statistics leaders 
UAAP Season 84 Women's Volleyball tournament statistics leaders at the end of the elimination round.

Best Scorers

Best Spikers

Best Blockers

Best Servers

Best Diggers

Best Setters

Best Receivers

Awards

 Most Valuable Player: 
 Rookie of the Year: 
 First Best Outside Spiker: 
 Second Best Outside Spiker: 
 First Best Middle Blocker: 
 Second Best Middle Blocker: 
 Best Opposite Spiker: 
 Best Setter: 
 Best Libero:

See also 
NCAA Season 97 volleyball tournaments

References 

UAAP volleyball tournaments
2022 in Philippine sport
Volleyball events postponed due to the COVID-19 pandemic